Khristos Bonas (born 13 November 1941) is a Greek sailor. He competed in the Flying Dutchman event at the 1972 Summer Olympics.

References

External links
 

1941 births
Living people
Greek male sailors (sport)
Olympic sailors of Greece
Sailors at the 1972 Summer Olympics – Flying Dutchman
Place of birth missing (living people)